Dyckia macedoi is a plant species in the genus Dyckia. It is endemic to the State of Minas Gerais in Brazil.

Cultivars
 × Dyckcohnia 'Conrad Morton'

References

macedoi
Endemic flora of Brazil
Plants described in 1952